The Gamble House, also known as the David B. Gamble House, is an iconic American Craftsman home in Pasadena, California, designed by the architectural firm Greene and Greene. Constructed in 1908–1909 as a home for David B. Gamble, son of the Procter & Gamble founder James Gamble, it is today a National Historic Landmark, a California Historical Landmark, and open to the public for tours and events.

History

One major feature of the Gamble House was to be distinct from many other houses nearby, such as the Neoclassical style Fenyes House (Robert Farquhar, 1906–1907). Considering that many Greene and Greene projects have been altered to some degree and stripped of their original furnishings designed for them by the architects, this house has been well maintained throughout its exterior and interior.

David and Mary Gamble lived in the house during the winter months until their deaths in 1923 and 1929, respectively. Mary's younger sister Julia lived in the house until her death in 1943. Cecil Huggins Gamble and his wife Louise Gibbs Gamble lived in the house beginning in 1946. They briefly considered selling it, until prospective buyers spoke of painting the interior woodwork white. In 1966, the Gamble family turned the house over to the city of Pasadena in a joint agreement with the University of Southern California (USC) School of Architecture. The Gamble House was declared a National Historic Landmark in 1977. Today, two 5th-year USC architecture students live in the house full-time; the selected students change annually.

The Gamble House was a target for criticism during the twentieth century. However, after the Second World War it received newfound popularity. It was included in a list of all-time top 10 houses in Los Angeles in a Los Angeles Times survey of experts in December 2008.

The exterior of the house gained worldwide exposure as Brown Mansion, the home (in 1955) of Emmett "Doc" Brown in the 1985 movie Back to the Future.

Additionally, the house was featured on This Old House with then host Bob Vila in 1987.

Design

Originally built as a winter residence for David and Mary Gamble, the three-story Gamble House is commonly described as America's Arts and Crafts masterpiece. Its style shows influence from traditional Japanese aesthetics and a certain California spaciousness born of available land and a permissive climate. The Arts and Crafts Movement in American Craftsman style architecture was focused on the use of natural materials, attention to detail, aesthetics, and craftsmanship.

The house is located on a grassy knoll overlooking Pasadena's Arroyo Seco, a broad, seasonally dry river bed. Because of the Gambles’ attraction to the environment, the Greenes designed the house to complement the rustic setting. The house's design reflected the Gambles' love of nature as flowers and trees were brought to the interior—creating pictures in wood, metal, art glass, and semi-precious stone. The building itself appears enmeshed with the landscape, achieved by a blend of man-made materials such as brick and rough dash-coat stucco and natural materials such as granite river stones and creeping fig that grows up onto the foundations of the terrace and steps.

The house displays a strong influence of Japanese architecture. The abstraction of clouds and mist as well as the other "oriental" characteristics applied to the house's doors, windows, screens, beams, chair, lanterns, and more were another way that the house showed its emphasis on nature as "forms found in nature are the inspiration for these patterns."

Another way the Greenes showed off the Gamble House's emphasis on nature was through the "theme of three," which was composed of three components that could be seen in every room. The theme of three grouped objects together, sometimes symmetrically arranged, but often not. The use of asymmetry alongside the classical balance reflects nature's welcoming of variety in proportions.

Interiors

The rooms of the home were built using multiple kinds of woods. Teak, maple, oak, Port Orford cedar, and mahogany surfaces are placed in sequences to bring out contrasts of color, tone, and grain. Inlay in the custom furniture designed by the architects coordinates with the inlay in the tiled fireplace surrounds, and the expressed, interlocking joinery on the main staircase was left exposed.

One of the wooden panels in the entry hall is actually a concealed door leading to the kitchen, and another panel opens to a coat closet.

The Greenes used an experienced team of local contractors who had worked together for them in Pasadena on several previous homes, including the Hall brothers, Peter and John, who were responsible for the high quality of the woodworking in the house and its furniture. The Gamble family crest, a crane and trailing rose, was integrated in part or whole in many locations around the house.

The woods, the low and horizontal room shapes, and the natural light that filters through the art glass exterior windows coexist with a relatively traditional plan, in which most rooms are regularly shaped and organized around a central hall. Although the house is not as spatially adventurous as the contemporary works of Frank Lloyd Wright, or even of the earlier New England "Shingle style," its mood is casual and its symmetries tend to be localized.

Ceiling heights are different on the first (8'10") and second floors (8'8") and in the den (9'10") and the forms and scales of the spaces are constantly shifting, especially as one moves from the interior of the house to its second-floor semi-enclosed porches and its free-form terraces, front and rear. The third floor was planned as a billiard room but was used as an attic by the Gamble family.

Rooms
The living room was designed without any entry doors so that the room would be as open and inviting as possible.  It also consisted of a spacious sitting room, which was decorated with five rugs that were designed by Charles Greene using watercolor. Across from the fireplace, there is a window the leads to the terrace, which overlooks the garden. The expansive window was designed to let light brighten the room during the late afternoon. At the far end of the room lie bookcases, a small games table, and a piano to offer entertainment and leisure. The piano was designed by the Greenes to blend into the paneling of the room.

On the west wing of the house, the dining room is surrounded by the terrace and the garden on three sides. According to Gamble House: Greene and Greene, by Edward R. Bosley, the room was designed to offer "nature to the indoors." The entrance of the room is diagonal from the hall with two doors. The doors are decorated with cloud-designed glass panels. The transition from hall to room was designed to provide a sense of "anticipation and discovery".

Exterior and gardens
Outdoor space was as important as the interior spaces. Exterior porches are found off three of the second-floor bedrooms and were used for sleeping or entertaining.

The main terrace is beyond the rear facade of the residence. It has patterned brick paving with planting areas, a large curvilinear pond, and garden walls made with distinctive clinker bricks and boulders. Paths made with large water-worn stones from the nearby Arroyo Seco are reminiscent of running brooks crossing the lawns. The overall landscape design and constructed garden elements are integrated with the architectural proportion and detailing. The triple front door and transom feature a Japanese black pine motif in plated (more than one layer) leaded art glass, highlighting the Asian influence that runs throughout the house.

California Historical Landmark Marker
California Historical Landmark Marker NO. 871  at the site reads:
NO. 871 THE GAMBLE HOUSE - Built in 1908, the David B. Gamble House is a tribute to the genius of architects Charles Sumner Greene and Henry Mather Greene. Its design represents a unique California lifestyle and is a masterpiece of American craftsmanship. In 1966 it was made a gift by the Gamble family to the City of Pasadena in a joint agreement with the University of Southern California.

Images

See also 
 Anglo-Japanese style
 Japonisme

References

Further reading
Images of The Gamble House - Masterwork of Greene & Greene, Jeanette Thomas, Univ. of So. Calif. 1989,

External links

Official Gamble House website

Houses completed in 1909
Historic house museums in California
California Historical Landmarks
Houses on the National Register of Historic Places in California
Buildings and structures on the National Register of Historic Places in Pasadena, California
National Historic Landmarks in California
Museums in Pasadena, California
Arts and Crafts architecture in California
Houses in Pasadena, California
Bungalow architecture in California
American Craftsman architecture in California
Tourist attractions in Pasadena, California
Greene and Greene buildings
Gilded Age mansions